The Seventh Floor is a 1967 Italian comedy film directed by and starring Ugo Tognazzi. It is based on the short story "Sette piani" by Dino Buzzati, featured in the 1942 short story collection The Seven Messengers. The film was entered into the 17th Berlin International Film Festival.

Cast
 Ugo Tognazzi as Giuseppe Inzerna
 Tina Louise as Dr. Immer Mehr
 Olga Villi as Anita, Inzerna wife
 Franca Bettoia as Giovanna, Inzerna's lover
 Alicia Brandet as Gloria, Inzerna daughter
 Gildo Tognazzi as Gerolamo, Inzerna's father
 Alessandro Quasimodo
 Gigi Ballista as Dr. Claretta
 Riccardo Garrone as Barbiere
 Marco Ferreri as Dr. Salamoia

References

External links

1967 films
1967 comedy films
Italian comedy films
1960s Italian-language films
Films based on works by Dino Buzzati
Films directed by Ugo Tognazzi
Medical-themed films
Films based on short fiction
1960s Italian films